The Irizar Century is a coach body manufactured by Irizar on Iveco, MAN, Mercedes-Benz, Scania and Volvo chassis.

It has many different bodystyles and are usually identified via the OBRA number on information plate next to the door.

The Century model has been replaced by the Irizar i6 but given the continued popularity of the model, Irizar has continued production of the Century for several years.

Chassis
Known chassis which the Irizar Century body has been built upon:

Iveco Delta
Iveco Eurorider
MAN 18.360/370/420 HOCL
Mercedes-Benz O404
Mercedes-Benz OH1830
Mercedes-Benz OC500RF
Scania K113CLA/TLA/CLB/TLB/CRB/TRB
Scania K94/114/124EB
Scania K94/114/124IB
Scania L94IB
Scania K340EB/K380EB/K400EB/K420EB /K380IB/K400IB
Scania F94/Scania F-series
Volvo B7R
Volvo B10M
Volvo B11R
Volvo B12
Volvo B13R

References

External links

Irizar Century official website

Coaches (bus)
Buses of Spain